Coventry Tainton (15 November 1902 – 29 December 1974) was a South African cricketer. He played in two first-class matches for Border in 1929/30.

See also
 List of Border representative cricketers

References

External links
 

1902 births
1974 deaths
South African cricketers
Border cricketers
Cricketers from East London, Eastern Cape